What Does Good Luck Bring? is the second and final studio album by American indie rock band No. 2, released in 2002 by record label In Music We Trust.

Release 

What Does Good Luck Bring? was released in 2002 by record label In Music We Trust.

Reception 

Matt Fink of AllMusic called it "another slab of uniformly solid indie rock".

Track listing 

 "A Little Confusion" – 4:44
 "More, More" – 3:37
 "Stranger's March" – 3:53
 "For the Last Time" – 3:46
 "8:45 AM" – 1:57
 "Traveling" – 5:49
 "Is It True?" – 3:24
 "Good Intentions" – 4:37
 "What Does Good Luck Bring?" – 4:20
 "Who's Behind The Door?" (2017 bonus track, featuring Elliott Smith)

Personnel 

 Neil Gust – vocals, guitar, keyboards
 Paul Pulvirenti – drums, percussion
 Jim Talstra – backing vocals, bass

 Additional personnel

 Sam Coomes – keyboards (on the track "What Does Good Luck Bring")

 Technical personnel

 Joanna Bolme – engineering
 Jeff Saltzman – engineering, mixing
 Tony Lash – mastering

References 

2000 albums